Tamil Nadu Government Dental College, also known as Government Dental Hospital and College, is the dental wing of the Madras Medical College. Although the college is a separate entity administratively, it is functionally integrated with the Madras Medical College and Government General Hospital.

The hospital is claimed to be the first in the country to provide treatment to 1,000 to 1,500 patients a day in various branches.

Expansion
In 2012, new annexe building constructed at a cost of  206.3 million was inaugurated by the then Chief Minister Jayalalithaa. The new building consists of two floors with a capacity to treat nearly 300 patients at a time. The out-patient block and other facilities were transferred to the new building.

See also

 List of Tamil Nadu Government's Educational Institutions
 List of medical colleges in India
 Healthcare in Chennai

References

External links
Official Website

Educational institutions established in 1953
Medical colleges in Tamil Nadu
Universities and colleges in Chennai
Hospitals in Chennai
Dental colleges in India
1953 establishments in Madras State